Batang Hari may refer to:
 Batang Hari Regency, a regency in Jambi Province in Sumatra, Indonesia
 Batang Hari River, the longest river in Sumatra, Indonesia

id:Batang Hari